Simon Mbilinyi is a Tanzanian CCM politician and a former Member of Parliament for Peramiho constituency. He was a Tanzanian Ambassador to Belgium and Luxembourg from 1985–1989 and served as the Finance Minister from 1995–1996.

References

Living people
Chama Cha Mapinduzi MPs
Chama Cha Mapinduzi politicians
Tanzanian MPs 2000–2005
Finance Ministers of Tanzania
Cornell University alumni
Stanford University alumni
University of Dar es Salaam alumni
Ambassadors of Tanzania to Belgium
Ambassadors of Tanzania to Luxembourg
Year of birth missing (living people)